Vacuolar protein sorting proteins are involved in the intracellular sorting and delivery of soluble vacuolar proteins.

References

Single-pass transmembrane proteins